In statistical quality control, the regression control chart allows for monitoring a change in a process where two or more variables are correlated. The change in a dependent variable can be detected and compensatory change in the independent variable can be recommended. Examples from the Post Office Department provide an application of such models.

Regression control chart differs from a traditional control chart in four main aspects:
 It is designed to control a varying (rather than a constant) average.
 The control limit lines are parallel to the regression line rather than the horizontal line.
 The computations here are much more complex.
 It is appropriate for use in more complex situations.

References

Quality control tools
Statistical charts and diagrams